Las Huacas is a corregimiento in Río de Jesús District, Veraguas Province, Panama with a population of 965 as of 2010. Its population as of 1990 was 1,044; its population as of 2000 was 942.

References

Corregimientos of Veraguas Province